Milko Popchev (11 November 1964, Plovdiv) is a Bulgarian chess master.

Biography 
Popchev was born in Plovdiv in 1964, became International master in 1986 and Grandmaster in 1998. He played for the Bulgarian national team at the Chess Olympiads 1992 in Manila and 1998 in Elista. He won the individual gold medal for his board at the 1993 Men's Chess Balkaniads. His peak rating was 2513.

References

External links 

 Milko Popchev at Chessgames
 Milko Popchev at FIDE

Bulgarian chess players
Chess grandmasters
Living people
1964 births